Pulanaivu is a 2019 Malaysian Tamil-language crime thriller film. In the film, a couple is entangled in a murder at their college. Meanwhile, a female cop, Bhairavi, has to trace the few suspects and find the murderer.

It was released 14 November 2019 in Malaysia. The film has the highest number of cinema listings for local Tamil-language films. It is dubbed in Telugu as Chustanaa.

Synopsis 
Aishwarya is a woman who is just starting college, she is trying to move on from her previous relationship. So she is not interested when her new friend falls for her and tries hard to earn her love and attention. As their love story develops, a murder suddenly occurs in their college, putting their lives and loved ones in danger. Meanwhile, Bhairavi, a female cop is investigating the case. There are few suspects, will they find the right murderer?

Cast

Shaila V (Shaila Nair) as Bhairavi
Shalini Balasundaram as Aishwarya 
Kabil Ganesan as Athi
Sarankumar as Shiva
Krithigah Nair as Preethi
Shabby as Vignesh
Ley Shahrwind as Sharath
KS Maniam as Aishwarya's Dad
Shashi Tharan as Siddarth
Desmond Dass as Deepak
Mardinii as Janany
Irfan Zaini as Ravinder Singh
Pashini Sivakumar as Vaishnavi
Ramkumar Ravichandran as Sri Ram
Bavithira Anbarasu as Dhivya
Chandramohan as Mohan
Navinc Rajamohan
Manjula Joseph
Saresh D7 (Cameo Appearance)

Soundtrack
The album consists of 3 tracks. The first single is "En Sogame", sung by Indian singer Shakthisree Gopalan under the music direction of Jey Raggaveindra.

Release 
A critic from Astro Ulagam noted that "Every frame was carefully directed with clear substance and expressions. Each and every character in the movie was well picked by the director to the extend the voice modulation was apt for each character on its own!". A critic from Selliyal praised the 120 minute runtime, gripping screenplay, acting, cinematography, editing but criticised the screenplay glitches such as the lack of a day 3 and day 4 during the murder.

Accolades

See also 

 List of Malaysian Tamil films

References

External links
 

2019 films
Malaysian crime drama films
Tamil-language Malaysian films
2019 crime thriller films
Malaysian thriller films
2010s Tamil-language films